Francesco Calì (16 May 1882 – 3 September 1949) was an Italian professional football player, coach and referee, who played as a defender. He captained the Italy national football team in their first ever match, on 15 May 1910.

Early life
Calì was born in Riposto, Sicily on 16 May 1882, to Bruno Calì, a wine merchant. After pirate assaults on his father's business, he and his family immigrated to Switzerland two years later; he was nicknamed Franz.

Career
Calì played several games as a left-back for Swiss clubs Zürich and Urania Genève Sport. He then played for two rival Genovese teams: Genoa and Andrea Doria. He was also a referee during his time at Andrea Doria.

Due to his experience as a footballer, as well as his knowledge of several foreign languages, he was selected as the Italy national team captain, in their first ever game on 15 May 1910, in Milan against France, where Italy won 6–2.

After his retirement as a player, he was also chosen several times as a member of the Italian national team technical commission, in 1912, 1914, 1915, 1920 and 1921.

References

External links
 

1882 births
1949 deaths
Italian footballers
Italy international footballers
FC Zürich players
Urania Genève Sport players
Genoa C.F.C. players
U.C. Sampdoria players
Association football defenders
Italian football referees
Footballers from Sicily
Italian emigrants to Switzerland
Swiss men's footballers
People from Riposto